Eugène Allonsius (born 12 December 1937) is a retired Belgian middle- and long-distance runner. He competed at the 1960 and 1964 Summer Olympics in the 1500 metres and 5000 metres events, but failed to reach the finals.

During his career Allonsius set five national records. He was a two-time Belgian champion in the 1500 m, won the 5000 m national title at nine times, and was also the 1968 national champion in the 10,000 metres. In addition to this, he competed as a guest athlete in the mile run at the 1966 South African championships and won that race.

He won the long race at the 1963 World Military Cross Country Championships. He was the victor at the 1966 Volkscross in Brussels. In 1966 he established Allonsius Sport, a company specializing in athletics training and supplies.

References

1937 births
Living people
Athletes (track and field) at the 1960 Summer Olympics
Athletes (track and field) at the 1964 Summer Olympics
Olympic athletes of Belgium
Belgian male middle-distance runners
Belgian male long-distance runners
People from Terneuzen
Sportspeople from Zeeland